Załęże is a district of Katowice, Poland.

Załęże may also refer to:
Załęże, Lesser Poland Voivodeship (south Poland)
Załęże, Subcarpathian Voivodeship (south-east Poland)
Załęże, Masovian Voivodeship (east-central Poland)
Załęże, Silesian Voivodeship (south Poland)
Załęże, Człuchów County in Pomeranian Voivodeship (north Poland)
Załęże, Kartuzy County in Pomeranian Voivodeship (north Poland)
Załęże, West Pomeranian Voivodeship (north-west Poland)